Céleste Lett (born 7 May 1951 in Sarreguemines, Moselle) is a member of the National Assembly of France.  He represents the Moselle department,  and is a member of the Union for a Popular Movement.

He has three sons: Jean-Francois, Philippe, and Alexandre.

References

1951 births
Living people
People from Sarreguemines
Union for a Popular Movement politicians
Deputies of the 12th National Assembly of the French Fifth Republic
Deputies of the 13th National Assembly of the French Fifth Republic
Deputies of the 14th National Assembly of the French Fifth Republic